Chastity Belt is the fourth studio album by American band Chastity Belt. It was released September 20, 2019 under Hardly Art.

Critical reception
Chastity Belt was met with generally favorable reviews from critics. At Metacritic, which assigns a weighted average rating out of 100 to reviews from mainstream publications, this release received an average score of 77, based on 10 reviews.

Track listing

References

2019 albums
Chastity Belt (band) albums
Hardly Art albums